Marion Gordon "Pat" Robertson (born March 22, 1930) is an American media mogul,  religious broadcaster, political commentator, former presidential candidate, and former Southern Baptist minister. Robertson advocates a conservative Christian ideology and is known for his past activities in Republican party politics. He is associated with the Charismatic Movement within Protestant evangelicalism. He serves as chancellor and CEO of Regent University and chairman of the Christian Broadcasting Network (CBN).

On Robertson's own account, he originally set out to be a businessman. He graduated near the top of his class at Yale Law School in 1955 but later failed the New York bar exam, which he described as a minor setback since he never planned to practice law and he already had a career with a major corporation on Wall Street. He became a Christian while having dinner at a restaurant in Philadelphia with an author and WWII veteran, Cornelius Vanderbreggen. After his conversion, Robertson left the corporate world and went into ministry.

Spanning over five decades, Robertson is the founder of major organizations including The Christian Broadcasting Network (CBN), Regent University, Operation Blessing International Relief and Development Corporation, the International Family Entertainment Inc. (ABC Family Channel/Freeform), the American Center for Law & Justice (ACLJ), the Founders Inn and Conference Center, and the Christian Coalition. 

Robertson is also a best-selling author and the former host of The 700 Club, a Christian News and TV program broadcast live weekdays on Freeform (formerly ABC Family) from CBN studios, as well as on channels throughout the United States, and on CBN network affiliates worldwide. Robertson announced his retirement at the age of 91 from the 700 Club in October 2021, on the sixtieth anniversary of the first telecast on October 1, 1961 of what eventually became CBN.

The son of U.S. Senator A. Willis Robertson, Robertson was a Southern Baptist and was active as an ordained minister with that denomination for many years, but holds to a charismatic theology not traditionally common among Southern Baptists. He unsuccessfully campaigned to become the Republican Party's nominee in the 1988 presidential election. As a result of his seeking political office, he no longer serves in an official role for any church. His personal influence on media and financial resources make him a recognized, influential, and controversial public voice for conservative Christianity in the United States and around the world.

Early life
Marion Gordon Robertson was born on March 22, 1930, in Lexington, Virginia, into a prominent political family, the younger of two sons. His parents were Absalom Willis Robertson (1887–1971), a conservative Democratic Senator, and Gladys Churchill (née Willis; 1897–1968), a housewife and a musician. At a young age, Robertson was nicknamed Pat by his six-year-old brother, Willis Robertson, Jr., who enjoyed patting him on the cheeks when he was a baby while saying "pat, pat, pat". Later, Robertson thought about which first name he would like people to use. He considered "Marion" to be effeminate, and "M. Gordon" to be affected, so he opted for his childhood nickname "Pat".

When he was eleven, Robertson was enrolled in the preparatory McDonogh School outside Baltimore, Maryland. From 1940 until 1946 he attended The McCallie School in Chattanooga, Tennessee, where he graduated with honors. He gained admission to Washington and Lee University, where he received a B.A. in History, graduating magna cum laude. He was also a member of Phi Beta Kappa, the nation’s most prestigious academic honor society. He joined Sigma Alpha Epsilon fraternity. Robertson has said, "Although I worked hard at my studies, my real major centered around lovely young ladies who attended the nearby girls schools."

In 1948, the draft was reinstated and Robertson was given the option of joining the Marine Corps or being drafted into the Army; he opted for the first.

Robertson described his military service as follows: "We did long, grueling marches to toughen the men, plus refresher training in firearms and bayonet combat." In the same year, he transferred to Korea, "I ended up at the headquarters command of the First Marine Division," says Robertson. "The Division was in combat in the hot and dusty, then bitterly cold portion of North Korea just above the 38th Parallel later identified as the 'Punchbowl' and 'Heartbreak Ridge.'" For Robertson's service in the Korean War, the US Marines awarded him three Battle Stars.

In 1986, Former Republican Congressman Paul "Pete" McCloskey, Jr., who served with Robertson in Camp Pendleton, wrote a public letter challenging Robertson’s record in the military. Robertson filed a libel suit against McCloskey but he dropped the case in 1988 in order to devote “his full time and energies toward the successful attainment of the Republican nomination for the president of the United States.”

Robertson was promoted to First Lieutenant in 1952 upon his return to the United States. He then went on to receive a law degree from Yale Law School in 1955, near the top of his class. However, he failed his first and only attempt at the New York bar exam necessary for admission to the New York State Bar Association., which did not deter Robertson because he never intended to practice law anyway.  Shortly thereafter he underwent a religious conversion and decided against pursuing a career in business. Instead, Robertson attended The Biblical Seminary in New York, where he received a Master of Divinity degree in 1959.

Christian Broadcasting Network

In 1956, Robertson met Dutch missionary Cornelius Vanderbreggen, who impressed Robertson both by his lifestyle and his message. Vanderbreggen quoted Proverbs (3:5, 6), "Trust in the Lord with all thine heart; and lean not unto thine own understanding. In all thy ways acknowledge Him, and He shall direct thy paths", which Robertson considers to be the "guiding principle" of his life. He was ordained as a minister of the Southern Baptist Convention in 1961.

In 1960, Robertson established the Christian Broadcasting Network in Virginia Beach, Virginia. He started it by buying the license of a defunct UHF station in nearby Portsmouth. The station, with the call sign WYAH-TV, first broadcast on October 1, 1961. On April 29, 1977, CBN launched a religious cable network, the CBN Satellite Service, which eventually became The Family Channel.

In 1977 CBN became the first direct-to-cable, satellite-delivered television channel in America, delivering content to cable systems all over the country. The venture became so lucrative that it could not continue to be kept under a tax-exempt charity, so Robertson spun off The Family Channel into a separate commercial entity that was sold to News Corporation for $1.9 billion in 1997.

In 1994, he was an endorser of the document Evangelicals and Catholics Together.

Regent University

Robertson founded CBN University, a private Christian university, in 1977 on CBN's Virginia Beach campus. Since its founding, the university has established eight academic schools and offers associate, bachelor's, master's, and doctoral degrees in over 150 areas of study. It was renamed Regent University in 1990. According to the school's catalog, "a regent is one who represents Christ, our Sovereign, in whatever sphere of life he or she may be called to serve Him."

With more than 11,000 current students, Regent University has ranked the #1 Best Online Bachelor’s Program in Virginia for ten years in a row by U.S. News & World Report, 2022, as well as 2023 Best Graduate Schools-Law, Best Graduate Schools – Social Sciences and Humanities Doctoral Programs – Psychology, 2023 Best Graduate Schools – Public Affairs, and 2023 Best Education Schools by U.S. News & World Report. Robertson serves as its chancellor and CEO.

Robertson is also founder and president of the American Center for Law & Justice, a major public interest law firm headquartered in Washington, D.C. and associated with Regent University School of Law in Virginia Beach, Virginia, that defends Constitutional freedoms and conservative Christian ideals. Critics have characterized Robertson as an advocate of dominionism.

Operation Blessing

Robertson's Operation Blessing organization sent medical teams to developing countries to help people who had no access to medical care. In 1994, in the aftermath of the Rwandan genocide, Robertson solicited donations to provide medical supplies to refugees in neighboring Zaire (present-day Congo), where Robertson also had exploratory diamond mining operations. According to a 1999 article in The Virginian-Pilot, two Operation Blessing pilots who were interviewed alleged that the organization's planes were used to haul diamond-mining equipment to Robertson's mines in Zaire. Robertson has denied the pilots’ accounts.

In its 2021 ranking of "100 Largest Charities,” Forbes ranked Operation Blessing/CBN at #44, with an efficiency rating of over 90%.

Other ventures
Robertson is the founder and chairman of The Christian Broadcasting Network (CBN) Inc., and founder of International Family Entertainment Inc., Regent University, Operation Blessing International Relief and Development Corporation, American Center for Law and Justice, The Flying Hospital, Inc. and several other organizations and broadcast entities. Robertson was the founder and co-chairman of International Family Entertainment Inc. (IFE).

Formed in 1990, IFE produced and distributed family entertainment and information programming worldwide. IFE's principal business was The Family Channel, a satellite delivered cable-television network with 63 million U.S. subscribers. IFE, a publicly held company listed on the New York Stock Exchange, was sold in 1997 to Fox Kids Worldwide, Inc. for $1.9 billion, whereupon it was renamed Fox Family Channel. Disney acquired FFC in 2001 and its name was changed again, to ABC Family. The network was renamed to Freeform on January 12, 2016, though Robertson's sale of the channel continues to require Freeform to carry four hours of CBN/700 Club programming per weekday, along with CBN's yearly telethon.

Robertson is a global businessman with media holdings in Asia, the United Kingdom, and Africa. He struck a deal with Pittsburgh, Pennsylvania-based General Nutrition Center to produce and market a weight-loss shake he created and promoted on The 700 Club.

In 1999, Robertson entered into a joint venture with the Bank of Scotland to provide financial services in the United States. However, the venture fell through after progressive activists protested over Robertson’s Biblical views on an array of issues.

While some have estimated his wealth to be between $200 million and $1 billion, Robertson has pointed out that these estimates are not based on any facts and are incorrect.

A June 2, 1999 article in The Virginian-Pilot alleged that Robertson had business dealings with Liberian president Charles Taylor, with whom Robertson, according to the article, negotiated a multimillion- dollar contract for gold mining operations in Liberia. Robertson has denied any business dealings with Taylor, and he also denied ever speaking to President George W. Bush about Taylor's alleged activities. On February 4, 2010, at his war crimes trial in the Hague, Taylor testified that Robertson was his main political ally in the U.S., while Robertson has denied ever meeting or speaking to Charles Taylor.

Beginning in the latter part of the 1990s, Rev. Pat Robertson raced thoroughbred horses under the nom de course, Tega Farm. His gelding named Tappat won the 1999 Walter Haight Handicap at Laurel Park and the 2000 Pennsylvania Governor's Cup Handicap at Penn National Race Course. Following this success, Robertson paid $520,000 for a colt he named Mr. Pat. Trained by John Kimmel, Mr. Pat was not a successful runner. He was nominated for, but did not run in, the 2000 Kentucky Derby.

Political service and activism

Robertson is a past president of the Council for National Policy.  In 1982, he served on the Victims of Crime Task Force for President Reagan. In Virginia, he served on the Board of the Virginia Economic Development Partnership and on the Governor's Council of Economic Advisors.  After his unsuccessful presidential campaign, Robertson started the Christian Coalition, a 1.7-million-member Christian right organization that campaigned mostly for conservative candidates. Billy McCormack, a Southern Baptist pastor in Shreveport, Louisiana, served as one of the four directors of the coalition as well as its vice president.The coalition was sued by the Federal Election Commission "for coordinating its activities with Republican candidates for office in 1990, 1992 and 1994 and failing to report its expenditures," yet the complaint was dismissed by a federal judge. In March 1986, he told Israeli Foreign Affairs that South Africa was a major contributor to the Reagan administration's efforts to help the anti-Sandinista forces.

In 1994, the Coalition was fined for "improperly [aiding] then Representative Newt Gingrich (R-GA) and Oliver North, who was then the Republican Senate nominee in Virginia." Robertson left the Coalition in 2001.

Robertson has been a governing member of the Council for National Policy (CNP): Board of Governors 1982, President Executive Committee 1985–86, member, 1984, 1988, 1998.

On November 7, 2007, Robertson announced that he was endorsing Rudy Giuliani to be the Republican nominee in the 2008 Presidential election. Some social conservatives criticized Robertson's endorsement of Giuliani, a pro-choice candidate who supported gay rights.

While usually associated with the political right, Robertson has endorsed environmental causes. He appeared in a commercial with Al Sharpton, joking about this, and urging people to join the We Can Solve It campaign against global warming.

In January 2009, on a broadcast of The 700 Club, Robertson stated that he is "adamantly opposed" to the division of Jerusalem between Israel and the Palestinians. He also stated that Armageddon is "not going to be fought at Megiddo" but will be the "battle of Jerusalem," when "the forces of all nations come together and try to take Jerusalem away from the Jews. Jews are not going to give up Jerusalem—they shouldn't—and the rest of the world is going to insist they give it up." Robertson added that Jerusalem is a "spiritual symbol that must not be given away" because "Jesus Christ the Messiah will come down to the part of Jerusalem that the Arabs want," and that's "not good."

Robertson has repeatedly called for the legalization of cannabis, saying that it should be treated in a manner analogous to the regulation of alcoholic beverages and tobacco. Robertson has said, "I just think it's shocking how many of these young people wind up in prison and they get turned into hard-core criminals because they had a possession of a very small amount of controlled substance. The whole thing is crazy." In 2014, he turned against the legalization of cannabis.

1988 presidential bid

In September 1986, Robertson announced his intention to seek the Republican nomination for President of the United States. Robertson said he would pursue the nomination only if three million people signed up to volunteer for his campaign by September 1987. Three million responded, and by the time Robertson announced he would be running in September 1987, he also had raised millions of dollars for his campaign fund. He surrendered his ministerial credentials and turned leadership of CBN over to his son, Tim. However, his campaign against incumbent Vice President George H. W. Bush was seen as a long shot.

Robertson ran on a standard conservative platform, and as a candidate he embraced the same policies as Ronald Reagan: lower taxes, a balanced budget, and a strong defense.

Robertson's campaign got off to a strong second-place finish in the Iowa caucuses, ahead of Bush. He did poorly in the subsequent New Hampshire primary, however, and was unable to be competitive once the multiple-state primaries began. Robertson ended his campaign before the primaries were finished. His best finish was in Washington, winning the majority of caucus delegates. He later spoke at the 1988 Republican National Convention in New Orleans and told his remaining supporters to cast their votes for Bush, who ended up winning the nomination and the election. He then returned to CBN and remained there as a religious broadcaster.

Personal life

Marriage and family
In 1954, Robertson married Amelia "Dede" Elmer a fashion model and beauty queen in the Miss Ohio State contest, who was studying for her masters in nursing at Yale University. She had also been a nursing student at Ohio State University in Columbus, Ohio. They remained married until her death in 2022, and had four children, among them Gordon P. Robertson.

Health
On August 11, 2017, Robertson was hospitalized after sustaining minor injuries in a fall from a horseback riding incident.

On February 2, 2018, Robertson suffered an embolic stroke at his home in Virginia Beach. A member of his family noticed his symptoms and alerted emergency medical personnel. He was then taken to the nearest stroke center where he was administered the clot-busting drug tPA. Robertson was responsive, awake, and moving all of his limbs about eighty minutes after his stroke began. He was discharged two days later and recovered at home.  Following this incident, Robertson and his family thanked the paramedics and medical staff for their "extraordinary care and rapid response." They also urged people to learn about stroke, its symptoms and treatments. Robertson resumed his hosting duties on The 700 Club on February 12.

In June 2019, Robertson was absent from The 700 Club for several days after he broke three ribs in a fall. Upon his return, described the experience as very painful but said "Us old guys are tough and we try to stay in there and keep on going." He then thanked viewers for their prayers.

Controversies

As a commentator and minister, Robertson frequently generates controversy.  Some of his remarks have been the subject of national and international media attention prompting responses from politicians.

Robertson's service as a minister has included the belief in the healing power of God. He has cautioned believers that some Protestant denominations may harbor the spirit of the Antichrist; prayed to deflect hurricanes; denounced Hinduism as "demonic" and Islam as "Satanic". 

Robertson has denounced left-wing views of feminism, activism regarding homosexuality, abortion, and liberal college professors. Critics claim Robertson had business dealings in Africa with former president of Liberia and convicted war criminal Charles Taylor and former Zaire president Mobutu Sese Seko who both had been internationally denounced for claims of human rights violations. Robertson was criticized internationally for his call for Hugo Chávez's assassination and for his remarks concerning Ariel Sharon's ill-health as an act of God. In an interview on The 700 Club, Robertson stated: "I have said last year that Israel was entering into the most dangerous period of its entire existence as a nation. That is intensifying this year with the loss of Sharon. Sharon was personally a very likeable person. I am sad to see him in this condition. But I think we need to look at the Bible and the Book of Joel. The prophet Joel makes it very clear that God has enmity against those who, quote, 'divide my land.' God considers this land to be his. You read the Bible, he says, 'This is my land.' And for any prime minister of Israel who decides he going carve it up and give it away, God says, 'No. This is mine.' And the same thing -- I had a wonderful meeting with Yitzhak Rabin in 1974. He was tragically assassinated, and it was terrible thing that happened, but nevertheless, he was dead. And now Ariel Sharon, who was again a very likeable person, a delightful person to be with. I prayed with him personally. But here he is at the point of death. He was dividing God's land, and I would say woe unto any prime minister of Israel who takes a similar course to appease the EU, the United Nations or United States of America. God said, 'This land belongs to me, you better leave it alone.'”

During the week of September 11, 2001, Robertson interviewed Jerry Falwell, who expressed his own opinion that "the ACLU has to take a lot of blame for this" in addition to "the pagans, and the abortionists, and the feminists, and the gays, and the lesbians [who have] helped [the terror attacks of September 11th] happen." Robertson replied, "I totally concur". Both evangelists were seriously criticized by President George W. Bush for their comments, for which Falwell later issued an apology.

Less than two weeks after Hurricane Katrina killed 1,836 people, Robertson implied on the September 12, 2005 broadcast of The 700 Club that the storm was God's punishment in response to America's abortion policy. He suggested that the September 11 attacks and the disaster in New Orleans "could ... be connected in some way".

On November 9, 2009, Robertson said that Islam is "a violent political system bent on the overthrow of the governments of the world and world domination". He went on to elaborate that "you're dealing with not a religion, you're dealing with a political system, and I think we should treat it as such, and treat its adherents as such as we would members of the communist party, members of some fascist group".

Robertson's response to the 2010 Haiti earthquake also drew international condemnation. Robertson claimed that Haiti's founders had sworn a "pact to the Devil" in order to liberate themselves from the French slave owners and indirectly attributed the earthquake to the consequences of the Haitian people being "cursed" for doing so. CBN later issued a statement saying that Robertson's comments "were based on the widely-discussed 1791 slave rebellion led by Dutty Boukman at Bois Caïman, where the slaves allegedly made a famous pact with the devil in exchange for victory over the French".  Various figures in mainline and evangelical Christianity have on occasion disavowed some of Robertson's remarks.

In March 2015, Robertson compared Buddhism to a disease on The 700 Club. The American Center for Law and Justice (ACLJ), a conservative Christian watchdog group Robertson founded to promote Christian prayer in public schools, called for a multi-pronged attack on mindfulness programs because "they appear to be similar to Buddhist religious practices.  Proponents of secular mindfulness say mindfulness is not a Buddhist practice; it is a contemplative practice used in religious traditions around the world by many different names."

Publications
Robertson's book The New World Order (1991) became a New York Times best seller. A review by Ephraim Radner, an Episcopalian professor of theology, stated:

In October 2003, Robertson was interviewed by author Joel Mowbray about his book Dangerous Diplomacy, a book critical of the State Department. Robertson said that we could change American diplomacy by ridding ourselves of a large part of the State Department.

 Shout It from the Housetops, an autobiography with Jamie Buckingham (1972, repr 1995)
 My Prayer for You (1977)
 The Secret Kingdom (1982)
 Answers to 200 of Life's Most Probing Questions (1984)
 Beyond Reason: How Miracles can Change your Life (1985)
 America's Dates with Destiny (1986)
 The Plan (1989)
 The New Millennium (1990)
 The New World Order (1991)
 Turning Tide: The Fall of Liberalism and the Rise of Common Sense (1993) 
 The End of the Age (1995, fiction)
 Six Steps to Spiritual Revival: God's Awesome Power in Your Life (2002) 
 Bring It on: Tough Questions, Candid Answers, Nashville, Tenn: W Pub. Group, 2003.  
 The Ten Offenses (2004)
 Courting Disaster (2004)
 Miracles Can Be Yours Today (2006)
 On Humility (2009) 
 Right on the Money: Financial Advice for Tough Times (2009)
 I Have Walked With the Living God (2020) 
 The Power of the Holy Spirit in You: Understanding the Miraculous Power of God (2022)

See also
 Christian Fundamentalism
 Christian Zionism
 Moral Majority

References

Further reading
 
 
 Marley, David John. Pat Robertson: An American Life

External links

 
 Brian Ross. Some Question Robertson's Katrina Charity, ABC News, September 9, 2005.
 "Preacher: God told him about storms, tsunami"
 
 2000 lbs. leg press
 Robertson talks about his prostate cancer surgery with laparoscopic radical prostatectomy
 NPR Audio Report: Televangelist Robertson Urges U.S. Hit on Chavez
 Archive of American Television interview with Pat Robertson
 

1930 births
Living people
20th-century American male writers
20th-century American non-fiction writers
20th-century American politicians
20th-century Baptists
20th-century apocalypticists
21st-century American male writers
21st-century American non-fiction writers
21st-century Baptists
21st-century apocalypticists
American businesspeople
American Charismatics
American Christian Zionists
American critics of Islam
American male non-fiction writers
American racehorse owners and breeders
American television evangelists
Anti-Masonry
Anti-pornography activists
Baptists from New York (state)
Baptists from Virginia
Baptist writers
Candidates in the 1988 United States presidential election
Christian conspiracy theorists
Christian critics of Islam
Christian fundamentalists
Christian Old Earth creationists
Male critics of feminism
Military personnel from Virginia
People from Lexington, Virginia
People from Staten Island
People from Virginia Beach, Virginia
Regent University people
Religious scandals
United States Marine Corps officers
United States Marine Corps personnel of the Korean War
University and college founders
Virginia Republicans
Washington and Lee University alumni
Writers from Virginia
Yale Law School alumni